Prince John was a Georgian prince of royal Chosroid dynasty. Prince of Kakheti in 786-790, co-ruled with his younger brother Juansher of Kakheti.

He was a son of Prince Archil of Kakheti. Fleeing Arabs, Ioane retired in western Georgia accompanied by his mother and two sisters. Ioane died around 790 leaving no descendants.

References
Cyril Toumanoff, Les dynasties de la Caucasie chrétienne de l'Antiquité jusqu'au XIXe siècle : Tables généalogiques et chronologiques, Rome, 1990, p. 381.
Marie-Félicité Brosset, Histoire de la Géorgie, p. 256-260.

Princes of Kakheti
8th-century rulers in Europe
Chosroid dynasty
790 deaths